Martin Brimmer (June 8, 1793 – April 25, 1847) was an American businessman and politician, who served in the Massachusetts House of Representatives, in the Boston Board of Aldermen, and as the mayor of Boston, Massachusetts.

Early life
Brimmer was born in Roxbury, Massachusetts on June 8, 1793 to Martin, a merchant on Brimmer's T wharf, and Sarah (Watson) Brimmer.

Education
Brimmer attended Harvard, graduating in 1814.

Marriage
Brimmer married Harriet E Wadsworth of Geneseo, New York. They had one child, Martin Brimmer (1829–1896), an 1849 graduate of Harvard who served from 1859 to 1861 in the Massachusetts House of Representatives and was for 26 years the president of the Boston Museum of Fine Arts.

Business career

Brimmer began his business career working with Isaac Winslow on Long Wharf.  Later Brimmer ran a counting room on Brimmer's Wharf.

Government service
Brimmer was a Member of the Boston  Board of Aldermen from January 1, 1838 to January 7, 1839.  Brimmer serve in the Massachusetts House of Representatives in 1838 and 1839.  On  December 12, 1842 Brimmer was elected Mayor of Boston for 1843, on December 11, 1843 Brimmer was reelected mayor for the 1844 term.

Death
Brimmer died on April 25, 1847.

See also
 Timeline of Boston, 1830s–1840s

References 
 Image from Mayors of Boston: An Illustrated Epitome of who the Mayors Have Been and What they Have Done, Boston, MA: State Street Trust Company, Page 16, (1914).

Notes

External links 
 

People from Roxbury, Boston
Harvard University alumni
Massachusetts city council members
Members of the Massachusetts House of Representatives
Mayors of Boston
1793 births
1847 deaths
Massachusetts Whigs
19th-century American politicians